This is a list of notable indoor arenas in The Netherlands.

Constructed

See also
List of indoor arenas in Europe
List of indoor arenas by capacity
List of football stadiums in the Netherlands

References

Netherlands
Indoor arenas in the Netherlands
Indoor arenas
Indoor arenas